Warren Township is one of twelve townships in Warren County, Indiana, United States. According to the 2010 census, its population was 806 and it contained 324 housing units.

History
Warren Township was one of the original four created when the county was organized in 1827.

Geography
Kates Pond is in this township, and the streams of Dry Branch, Kickapoo Creek, Little Pine Creek, Middle Branch and West Fork Kickapoo Creek run through it.

The small town of Independence is on the shores of the Wabash River in the southeastern part of the township.  Winthrop is in the northwest portion of the township.

The original county seat of Warrenton was located in the far southwestern corner of what is now Warren Township, though at that time the township had not yet been created; no trace of Warrenton now exists.  Other towns in this township that have ceased to exist include Banning Corner, Black Rock, and Glen Cliff.

Cemeteries
The township contains these three cemeteries: Bethel, Independence and James.

Transportation
U.S. Route 41 passes through the far southwestern tip of the township on its way to Attica.  Indiana State Road 55 runs along the western border of the township, connecting Attica with Pine Village to the north in neighboring Adams Township.  The township contains Smith Brothers Airport.

Education
Warren Township is part of the Metropolitan School District of Warren County.

Government
Warren Township has a trustee who administers rural fire protection and ambulance service, provides relief to the poor, manages cemetery care, and performs farm assessment, among other duties. The trustee is assisted in these duties by a three-member township board. The trustees and board members are elected to four-year terms.

Warren Township is part of Indiana's 8th congressional district, Indiana House of Representatives District 26, and Indiana State Senate District 23.

References

 
 United States Census Bureau TIGER/Line Shapefiles

Bibliography

External links

Townships in Warren County, Indiana
1827 establishments in Indiana
Populated places established in 1827
Townships in Indiana